Ian McLean (born 30 January 1954) is an Australian cricketer. He played in twenty-three first-class matches for South Australia between 1976 and 1983.

See also
 List of South Australian representative cricketers

References

External links
 

1954 births
Living people
Australian cricketers
South Australia cricketers
Cricketers from Adelaide